The Ministry of Information Communications, and Technology was created in June 2004 due to a cabinet reshuffle. It is responsible for Information, Broadcasting and Communication policies.

Departments 
The ministry's departments are Administration, Human resources, Finance and Accounts; Economic Planning, Procurement, Aids Control Unit and Public Communications.

Projects

Digital Literacy Program 
The Digital Literacy Program was started to improve access to technology in schools.

Constituency Digital Innovation Hubs Program 
Although the project is new, recently the concept was created in Limuru.

Digital Migration Project 
The Digital Migration Project tries to switch the country from analogue TV and Medium Wave radio to digital broadcast TV and Transmission-KBC radio. The increase in digital broadcast TV has been rapid while the increase in Transmission-KBC radio has been slower, with the project only being 50% complete.

References 

Government agencies established in 2004
2004 establishments in Kenya
Government ministries of Kenya